Track and Trail is the name of an album by Colombian group Kraken   It was released on October 1, 2003 by Athena Productions.

Information 
This album brings a total of twenty songs divided into two discs, including songs like "Crystal Dress", "Fragile in the Wind", "Every Man Is a Story", and "Blue".

Track listing 
CD 1

CD 2

References 

Kraken (band) albums
2003 albums